Sive Ricardo Pekezela (born 3 April 1992) is a South African footballer who plays for Gefle IF as a midfielder.

Career
Pekezela started out playing street football in Cape Town before joining the youth ranks of Vasco Da Gama when he was 11 years old. In 2009, he joined the ASD Cape Town Academy. They went on a tour to Belgium in 2011 where he impressed enough to get picked up by Belgian club Beerschot AC. He was however let go after only one season due to the club's financial situation and returned to South Africa. During the autumn of 2012 he came to Sweden where he trialed with GIF Sundsvall, Enköpings SK and Gefle IF. In early 2013 he eventually ended up signing with Allsvenskan club Gefle IF.

References

External links

1992 births
Living people
South African expatriate soccer players
Expatriate footballers in Belgium
Expatriate footballers in Sweden
Association football midfielders
Beerschot A.C. players
Gefle IF players
Allsvenskan players
South African soccer players
Sportspeople from Cape Town